Albino is both a given name and a surname. Notable people with the name include:

 Albino Luciani (1912–1978), better known as Pope John Paul I
 Albino Souza Cruz (1869–1962), Brazilian businessman
 Albino Núñez Domínguez (1901–1974), Galician writer and poet
 Albino Jara (1877–1912), provisional President of Paraguay from 19 January to 5 July 1911
 Albino Pérez (died 1837), Mexican soldier and politician
 Francisco Alves Albino (1912–1993), Portuguese footballer
 Albino Pierro (1916–1995), Italian poet
 Albino SyCip, Chinese-Filipino financier
 Johnny Albino (1919–2011), Puerto Rican bolero singer
 Nina and Natalie Albino (Puerto Rican identical twins born 1984), who form the musical duo Nina Sky
 Albino Aboug (born 1979), South Sudanese politician